Anton Fernbach-Ferenczi (also known as Antal Ferenczi; 4 March 1925 – 1989*) was a Romanian football forward and manager. He scored the winning goal in the 2–1 victory against CSU Cluj in the 1949 Cupa României final, which helped CCA București win the first Cupa României in the club's history.

International career
Fernbach-Ferenczi played one game at international level for Romania in a 5–1 loss against Hungary at the 1948 Balkan Cup.

Death*
His death date is missing, but according to the statements of some people who knew him, he was the manager of Olimpia Salonta in the late 1980s (1988 most probably). After half of the season, he left the club and died at short time after (within a year). Fernbach-Ferenczi probably died somewhere between 1988 and 1989.

Honours
Nagyváradi AC
Nemzeti Bajnokság I: 1943–44
CCA București
Divizia A: 1951
Cupa României: 1948–49, 1950, 1951
Locomotiva București
Divizia B: 1952, 1955

Notes

References

External links

Anton Fernbach-Ferenczi at Labtof.ro

1925 births
1989 deaths
Romanian footballers
Romania international footballers
Association football forwards
Liga I players
Liga II players
Nemzeti Bajnokság I players
CA Oradea players
FC Steaua București players
CFR Cluj players
FC Rapid București players
Romanian expatriate footballers
Expatriate footballers in Hungary
Expatriate sportspeople in Hungary
Romanian expatriates in Hungary
Romanian expatriate sportspeople in Hungary
People from Oradea
Romanian football managers
FC Bihor Oradea managers